Zula is an unincorporated community in Wayne County, in the U.S. state of Kentucky.

History
A post office called Zula was established in 1901, and remained in operation until it was discontinued in 1975. The community was named for Zula Frost.

References

Unincorporated communities in Wayne County, Kentucky
Unincorporated communities in Kentucky